Joseph Midiburo (1930 – 13 June 2008) was a Congolese politician who served as the third President of the Chamber of Deputies of the Democratic Republic of the Congo.

Early life 
Joseph Midiburo was born in 1930 in Bwisha, Rutshuru Territory, Belgian Congo. He could speak Kinyarwanda. He underwent four years of secondary education and took correspondence courses on accounting.

Midiburo founded the Rassemblement de l'Est du Congo (RECO/REKO) party, which later merged with the Centre du Regroupement Africain (CEREA). He subsequently became a vice president of the party. He served on the Executive College of the Goma territory.

Career 
Midiburo was elected to the first Congolese Chamber of Deputies in May 1960 on a CEREA ticket from the North Kivu constituency. On 21 June, he was elected 74 votes to 55 to become the Second Vice-President of the Chamber of Deputies.

In October he was made a member of a commission assembled by deposed Prime Minister Patrice Lumumba tasked with managing his relations with the United Nations Operation in the Congo. He briefly served in the Stanleyville government from late 1960 until he returned to the capital, Léopoldville, in mid-1961.

Midiburo was elected First Vice-President of the Chamber on 24 July 1961. In October 1962 he was arrested by Cyrille Adoula's government on charges of subversion, but he was released several weeks later. He was elected President of the Chamber on 3 March 1963.

In April 1963, Parliament resolved to create a joint committee to prepare revisions for the constitution. Though the presiding officers of both houses nominally chaired the committee together, Midiburo was left responsible for leading the panel. He served as President of the Chamber until September 1965. He took part in organising the Conference Nationale Souveraine of the early 1990s.

Death 
Midiburo died on 13 June 2008 while receiving medical care in Kinshasa in the presence of his son, Adolphe.

Citations

References 

 
 
 
 
 
 
 
 

1930 births
2008 deaths
Presidents of the National Assembly (Democratic Republic of the Congo)
People of the Congo Crisis
People from North Kivu
21st-century Democratic Republic of the Congo people